Romolo Lazzaretti (17 November 1895 – 3 November 1976) was an Italian racing cyclist. He won stage 10 of the 1924 Giro d'Italia.

References

External links
 

1895 births
1976 deaths
Italian male cyclists
Italian Giro d'Italia stage winners
Sportspeople from the Province of Grosseto
Cyclists from Tuscany